Microsystems was a personal computing magazine founded by Sol Libes and published from January 1980 to November 1984.  Oriented toward the home and business personal computer user, it included an editorial page, letters from readers, technical articles, and advertisements.  As a historical reference, it is notable for chronicling in detail the early days of the personal computer.  Topics covered in its issues included:
 IEEE-696 / S-100 bus systems
 the CP/M operating systems from Digital Research: CP/M-80, CP/M Plus, CP/M-86, and MP/M
 the MS-DOS operating system from Microsoft
 implementations of the PL/I language: PL/I-80 and PL/I-86 from Digital Research
 the Turbo Pascal and UCSD Pascal languages
 the 8080, Z80, 8086, and 80286 microprocessors

History
As the nascent personal computer industry grew, the magazine changed as well.  The front cover of the magazine adopted various titles throughout its history:
 MICROSYSTEMS - the CP/M and S-100 user's journal
 Microsystems - the CP/M user's journal
 Microsystems - the journal for advanced microcomputing

In 1983, Ziff-Davis took over publication of the magazine, but decided in September 1984 to stop publication, citing "poor circulation and lack of substantial growth potential". The circulation at that time was about 55,000.

Sol Libes resumed publication of the magazine under a new title in March 1985, as Micro/Systems Journal "for the Advanced Computer User".

References

Bimonthly magazines published in the United States
Monthly magazines published in the United States
Defunct computer magazines published in the United States
Magazines established in 1980
Magazines disestablished in 1984
Magazines published in New Jersey